The Belgium Roller Hockey League was the biggest Roller Hockey Championship in Belgium. The last edition took place in 1999. The Belgium clubs have taking part in the Dutch NRBB (Dutch Roller Hockey League).

List of Winners

Number of Men's Senior Championships by Region

References

External links

Belgium websites
 Federacion Belge Francophone de Patinage
Vlaamse Roller Bond
K. Modern SCW
Rolta Leuven
Sunday´s

International
 Roller Hockey links worldwide
 Mundook-World Roller Hockey
Hardballhock-World Roller Hockey
Inforoller World Roller Hockey 
 World Roller Hockey Blog
World Roller Hockey
HoqueiPatins.cat - World Roller Hockey

Roller hockey competitions in Belgium
Roller hockey in Belgium
National championships in Belgium
National roller hockey championships